Aromatic L-amino acid decarboxylase deficiency is a rare genetic disorder caused by mutations in the DDC gene, which encodes an enzyme called aromatic L-amino acid decarboxylase.

Signs and symptoms

Babies with severe aromatic L-amino acid decarboxylase deficiency usually present during the first few months of life.  Symptoms can include:
 Hypotonia (floppiness)
 Developmental delay
 Oculogyric crises
 Difficulty with initiating and controlling movements
 Dystonia and dyskinesia
 Gastointestinal dysmotility which can present at as vomiting, gastro-oesophageal reflux, diarrhoea and/or constipation
 Autonomic symptoms including difficulties controlling temperature and blood sugar, excessive sweating and nasal congestion

Some people may develop cerebral folate deficiency, because O-methylation of the excessive amounts of L-Dopa can deplete methyl donors such as S-adenosyl methionine and levomefolic acid. This deviation can be detected by measuring the levels of levomefolic acid in the cerebrospinal fluid, and can be corrected by folinic acid.

Genetics

Aromatic L-amino acid decarboxylase deficiency is an autosomal recessive condition, meaning an individual needs to have two faulty copies of the DDC gene in order to be affected.  Usually, one copy is inherited from each parent.

Pathophysiology

The aromatic L-amino acid decarboxylase deficiency enzyme is involved in the synthesis of dopamine and serotonin, both of which are important neurotransmitters.

Diagnosis

Once there is a clinical suspicion of the diagnosis, neurotransmitters can be analysed in cerebrospinal fluid from a lumbar puncture.  If these show the pattern of abnormalities typical for aromatic L-amino acid decarboxylase deficiency, the diagnosis can be confirmed by genetic testing and/or measurement of enzyme activity.

Treatment
There is no cure for aromatic L-amino acid decarboxylase deficiency, but medical and multidisciplinary treatment can relieve some of the symptoms. Individuals will require physiotherapy, occupational therapy, and speech and language therapy. Some will need enteral feeding (for example, a gastrostomy or jejunostomy) due to difficulties with chewing and swallowing.

Various medications can help compensate for the missing neurotransmitters. Dopamine agonists such as rotigotine or pramipexole and monoamine oxidase inhibitors such as selegiline are commonly used. Individuals may also need to take a range of other medications to control dyskinesia, constipation and other symptoms.

In July 2021, results of a small gene therapy phase I study reported observation of dopamine restoration on seven participants between 4 and 9 years old.

As of May 2022, the gene therapy product eladocagene exuparvovec is recommended for approval by the European Commission.

References

External links 

Genetic diseases and disorders